William Edward Kretschmar (August 21, 1933 – August 18, 2017) was an American politician who was a member of the North Dakota House of Representatives. He represented the 28th district as a Republican, having been re-elected in 2000 and serving until 2016. He also served another term in the House, from 1973 to 1998. During his first term, he was Speaker of the House briefly from 1988 to 1990. Kretschmar lived in Venturia, North Dakota. He was alumnus of the College of Saint Thomas, of Saint Paul, Minnesota, and the University of Minnesota, and was an attorney by profession. He was of German descent. He was a self-described "Rockefeller Republican" and died on August 18, 2017.

References

External links
 

1933 births
2017 deaths
Politicians from Saint Paul, Minnesota
People from McIntosh County, North Dakota
University of Minnesota alumni
University of St. Thomas (Minnesota) alumni
North Dakota lawyers
American people of German descent
Speakers of the North Dakota House of Representatives
Republican Party members of the North Dakota House of Representatives
21st-century American politicians
20th-century American lawyers